is a guitarist in the Japanese rock band Every Little Thing. Ito also works in composition and, sometimes, arrangement of some of Every Little Thing's songs.

Solo discography

Albums
 Diversity (2009)

Other programs 
Ito Ichiro has made regular guest cast appearances in Gaki no Tsukai's annual 24 hour batsu games. He often portrays himself as a soft-spoken guy in the annual event and is often subjected to being pinched in the nose or ear by a Kuwagata Beetle, known as Stag Beetle in English.

References

External links
Official website 

1967 births
Living people
Japanese rock guitarists
Every Little Thing (band) members
People from Yokosuka, Kanagawa
Musicians from Kanagawa Prefecture
20th-century Japanese guitarists
21st-century Japanese guitarists